Alizarin crimson may refer to:
 Alizarin crimson (color), a particular shade of red 
 Alizarin, a paint pigment

See also
 Rose madder